The subfamily Emarginulinae, common name keyhole limpets and slit limpets, is a taxonomic subfamily of limpet-like sea snails, marine gastropod molluscs in the family Fissurellidae, the keyhole limpets and slit limpets.

The subfamily consists of the following tribes:
 Tribe Emarginulini Children, 1834 - synonyms: Rimulidae, Anton, 1838; Zeidoridae Naef, 1913; Hemitominae Kuroda, Habe & Oyama, 1971; Clypidinidae Golikov & Starobogatov, 1989
 Tribe Diodorini Odhner, 1932: this tribe has been raised to the rank of subfamily Diodorinae Odhner, 1932 
 Tribe Fissurellideini Pilsbry, 1890
 Tribe Scutini Christiaens, 1973

Of the subfamilies in Fissurellidae, the subfamily Emarginulinae is the oldest: its earliest known species date back to the Mesozoic.

The various tribes belong to this subfamily because of the unifying features in their radula. Several tribes were formerlysynonym of subfamilies, because of the differences in their shell. The Emargulini have a caplike shell with a slit in the margin but without an apical opening (foramen). The Scutini have a flat shield-shaped shell with  a vague indentation at the back. The other tribes have a caplike shell with a round, oval or triangular apical opening.

The species of this subfamily can be found attached to rocks or coral. They are Herbivores.

Genera
 Agariste Monterosato, 1892
 Altrix Palmer, 1942
 Arginula Palmer, 1937
 Buchanania Lesson, 1831
 Clathrosepta McLean & Geiger, 1998
 Clypidina Gray, 1847
 Emarginella Pilsbry, 1891
 Emarginula Lamarck, 1801
 † Entomella Cossmann, 1888 
 Fissurisepta Seguenza, 1863
 Laeviemarginula Habe, 1953
 Laevinesta Pilsbry & McGinty, 1952
 Manganesepta McLean & Geiger, 1998
 Montfortula Iredale, 1915
 † Palaeoloxotoma Hansen, 201 
 Parmaphorella Strebel, 1907
 Pupillaea Gray, 1835
 Rixa Iredale, 1924
 Scelidotoma McLean, 1966
 Scutus Montfort, 1810
 Stromboli Berry, 1954
 Tugali Gray, 1843
 Tugalina Habe, 1953
 Vacerrena Iredale, 1958
Taxa inquirenda
 Clypidella Swainson, 1840
 Rimulanax Iredale, 1924 (possible synonym of Puncturella)

Synonyms
 Aviscutum Iredale, 1940synonym of Scutus Montfort, 1810
 Entomella Cotton, 1945synonym of Emarginula Lamarck, 1801 (invalid: junior homonym of Entomella Cossmann, 1888; Notomella is a replacement name)
 † Loxotoma P. Fischer, 1885 synonym of † Palaeoloxotoma Hansen, 2019 (invalid: junior homonym of Loxotoma Zeller, 1854 [Lepidoptera]; Palaeoloxotoma is a replacement name)
 Nannoscutum Iredale, 1937synonym of Scutus Montfort, 1810
 Notomella Cotton, 1957synonym of Emarginula Lamarck, 1801
 Parmophoridea Wenz, 1938synonym of Parmaphorella Strebel, 1907 (unnecessary replacement name)
 Parmophorus Blainville, 1817synonym of Scutus Montfort, 1810 (unnecessary substitute name for Scutus)
 Plagiorhytis P. Fischer, 1885synonym of Montfortula Iredale, 1915 (Invalid: junior homonym of Plagiorhytis Chaudoir, 1848)
 Rimularia Bronn, 1838synonym of Rimula Defrance, 1827 (unjustified emendation of Rimula Defrance, 1827)
 Scutum P. Fischer, 1885synonym of Scutus Montfort, 1810 (invalid: unjustified emendation of Scutus)
 Semperia Crosse, 1867synonym of Emarginula Lamarck, 1801
 Subzeidora Iredale, 1924synonym of Emarginula (Subzeidora) Iredale, 1924 represented as Emarginula Lamarck, 1801
 Tugalia Gray, 1857synonym of Tugali Gray, 1843
 Vacerra Iredale, 1924synonym of Vacerrena Iredale, 1958 (invalid: junior homonym of Vacerra Godman, 1900 [Lepidoptera];Vacerrena is a replacement name)
 Variegemarginula McLean, 2011synonym of Montfortula Iredale, 1915

References

 Children J.G. (1834). [Mollusca]. Pp. 88-118, in: Synopsis of the contents of the British Museum, ed. 28: 88-118. [Authorship attributed to Children after G. Steiner & A.R. Kabat, 2001, Zoosystema, 23(3): 454-45]
 Bouchet P., Rocroi J.P., Hausdorf B., Kaim A., Kano Y., Nützel A., Parkhaev P., Schrödl M. & Strong E.E. (2017). Revised classification, nomenclator and typification of gastropod and monoplacophoran families. Malacologia. 61(1-2): 1-526

External links
 Pilsbry, H. A. (1890-1891). Manual of conchology, structural and systematic, with illustrations of the species. (1)12: Stomatellidae, Scissurellidae, Pleurotomariidae, Haliotidae, Scutellinidae, Addisoniidae, Cocculinidae, Fissurellidae, pp. 1-192, pls 1-45 [1890, 193-323, pls 46-65 [1891]. Philadelphia, Conchological Section, Academy of Natural Sciences]

Fissurellidae
Taxa named by John George Children